Dayton, Michigan may refer to:
 Dayton, Berrien County, Michigan, an unincorporated community situated on Dayton Lake
 Dayton, Tuscola County, Michigan, also known as Daytona Station, an unincorporated community in Wells Township
 Dayton Township, Newaygo County, Michigan 
 Dayton Township, Tuscola County, Michigan

See also 
 Dayton Center, Michigan, an unincorporated community in Dayton Township, Newaygo County
 East Dayton, an unincorporated community on the border of Wells Township and Dayton Township in Tuscola County